Bageecha is a 2018 Maldivian 3D computer-animated comedy film directed by Yamin Rasheed. Produced under Cellmin Animation Studio, it marks the first Maldivian 3D animated cartoon film release for cinema. The film revolves around a man's adventure to sustain a happy family with his four wives. It was released on 10 November 2018.

Voice cast
 Mohamed Waheed
 Inayath Ali 
 Aishath Shanaz
 Aminath Shama
 Raniya Mohamed
 Kama Najeeb

Development
Story of the film was being written by Yamin Rasheed during 2010, before it was stalled due to the tight schedule of then ongoing animated comedy TV series Maakana Show which is also written and directed by Yamin. After quitting the latter, Yamin resumed the story from where it was left and developed the story to a screenplay before the animation process begins.

Release
The trailer of the film was released on 11 September 2012. It was initially planned to release the film in October 2012, though the release date was later postponed since the cinema was closed for renovation during the time. The film was premiered on 10 November 2018 at Schwack Cinema by then president-elect of Maldives Ibrahim Mohamed Solih.

References

2018 3D films
2018 computer-animated films
Animated comedy films
Animated films about animals
2018 films
Maldivian comedy films
2018 comedy films
Dhivehi-language films